Concentração Motard de Faro is an annual motor-cycle rally held in Portugal.

Moto Clube de Faro Reunion spans 4 Days and an average of 30,000 Bikers every year.

History
The event dates back to the 1970s to the origin of the then Faro Motorbike Club in that a group of friends gave I initiate, still without suspect of the future success, to the participation in activities motorcyclists, as the motocross and the speed. This association, with around 30 elements, resulted in the formation and legalization of the Faro Club Motorbike on 5 February 1982, being practically all holders of motorbikes or motorized.  To the date, the Espirito Creative revealed itself in the success of the organization of some tests of speed in circuits of cycling (trails of Loulé and Tavira), and supply of motocross in Faro, captivating more people for the group, developing and implementing the affection by the two wheels.

Now, with 24 years of formal existence, after passing for three headquarters, increase I number of members over 400, and possess some own logistic means, is motive of honor the work performed, expecting itself in the future more challenges, required by the dimension by the Espirito Enterprising and whenever possible innovative.  You governed itself the recognition of the Federation Europeia of Motorcycling (FEMA), with the which itself mantém collaboration.

References

Motorcycle rallies in Portugal